Acheroniotes mlejneki is a species of beetle in the family Carabidae, the only species in the genus Acheroniotes.

References

Trechinae